Owain Williams is the name of:

Owain Williams (politician), Welsh politician
Owain Williams (rugby union) (1964–2021), Welsh rugby union player
Owain Fôn Williams (born 1987), Welsh footballer
Owain Williams, Welsh guitarist with the rock group Xerath